Wanessa Camargo is the second studio album by Brazilian pop singer Wanessa Camargo, released on November 10, 2001. The lead single was "Eu Quero Ser o Seu Amor". The album sold about 500,000 copies in Brazil, and was certified gold by Associação Brasileira dos Produtores de Discos (ABPD).

Development
The album follows the same line as the first album, which consists mostly of romantic songs, also featuring a lighter outline of more danceable songs, such as the first single, "Eu Quero Ser o Seu Amor", and the songs "Enfeitiçada" and "Tudo Bem", showing an expressive maturation in the singer's voice. It also brings interactive track to computer, with testimonials of the singer and music video of the track "Eu Posso Te Sentir" of its first album. One of the composers and producers of the album Jason Deere is American he composes the songs in English and later Wanessa passes to Portuguese. The songs are from Wanessa herself and not from other artists. Although "Gostar De Mim" was single and received a music video (directed by Hugo Prata), the song was no longer included in the singer's concerts.

Track listing

Personnel
 César Lemos - arranger, bass, electric guitar, synthesizer
 Silvio Richetto - organ, percussion
 Jonathan Yudkin - banjo, strings
 Zé Henrique - bass
 Glenn Worf - bass
 Shannon Forrest - drums
 Bepe Gemelli - drums
 Marcelão - drums, loops, percussion
 Silvio Richetto - percussion
 Glenn Pearce - electric guitar
 Russ Paul - electric guitar
 Mike Noble - guitar
 Serginho Knust - electric guitar, slide guitar
 Russ Paul - sitar
 Byron Hagan - synthesizer
 Vitor Chicri - keyboards

Certifications

References

2001 albums
Wanessa Camargo albums
Portuguese-language albums
RCA Records albums